Neil Simon Fitzmaurice (born 20 August 1969) is an English actor, comedian, and writer. He is best known for his role as Jeff, the love rival of protagonist Mark Corrigan, in the Channel 4 sitcom Peep Show. He has written for a number of other shows, including Peter Kay's Phoenix Nights (in which he also starred) and Benidorm.

Career

Writing
Fitzmaurice's writing projects include That Peter Kay Thing, for which he received a British Comedy Award, and the critically acclaimed Phoenix Nights, in which he also appeared as "Ray-Von". He has also written two feature films: Going Off Big Time, in 1999, which was nominated for four BIFA awards and is part of Film Four's Best of British, and more recently Charlie Noades R.I.P.

Acting
As an actor, Fitzmaurice has appeared in Going off Big Time (which he also wrote), played Jeff in the Channel 4 comedy series Peep Show, and starred in the prison drama series Buried. He appeared on the first episode of The Office as the applicant whom David Brent interviews for the warehouse position. He plays the same character in the sixth episode, only this time Brent is giving him a redundancy notice. Fitzmaurice has also performed alongside Paul O'Grady in the BBC comedy Eyes Down, had guest roles in the long-running police drama The Bill and on the Casualty spin-off Holby City.

In 2007, he played a lead role in the ITV drama Mobile, as an ex-telecoms worker suffering from a terminal brain tumour. From 2000 he worked on the film Charlie Noades RIP with his brother Tony. The film was in development hell due to funding not being available. Work finally began in 2007, despite the full budget not being in place. The film premiered at the Cannes Film Festival in 2009. Around the time of the premiere, Fitzmaurice returned to the stage for the first time in ten years, playing Shaun in On the Ledge at Liverpool's Royal Court Theatre.

Fitzmaurice played Les in an episode of the BBC One miniseries Moving On, "Dress to Impress", as well as the film Fifteen Minutes That Shook the World as the Liverpool manager Rafa Benitez. He starred in the hit play "One Night in Istanbul" at the Liverpool Empire and Dublin's Grand Canal Theatre.

On 16 February 2009, Fitzmaurice started presenting the Drivetime show on Radio City 96.7 in Liverpool. Due to film and television commitments, he left this position on 4 March 2011.

In 2011, Fitzmaurice starred in British school drama Waterloo Road as Dave Dowling, a parent with xenophobic and racist views. In 2011 he also starred in the fourth series of Benidorm as Lucky Kev who lived in the same caravan campsite as Madge Harvey. He later appeared in the fifth episode of the series reprising the role of Lucky Kev who works at a bar in Benidorm which Madge Harvey was interested in buying.

In 2013, he appeared in one episode of Truckers. In 2014 he starred as Dad in the BBC comedy series Hank Zipzer.

From 2011 to 2017 Fitzmaurice starred in the Sky comedy-drama Mount Pleasant, playing the part of office manager Fergus.

Personal life
Fitzmaurice was born and raised in Liverpool. He is a Liverpool FC fan and a survivor of the Hillsborough disaster, later being featured in the 2009 documentary Hillsborough Remembered.

Filmography

References

External links

1969 births
Living people
English television writers
English male television actors
Male actors from Liverpool
British male television writers